The 1955 Purdue Boilermakers football team was an American football team that represented Purdue University during the 1955 Big Ten Conference football season. In their ninth and final season under head coach Stu Holcomb, the Boilermakers compiled a 5–3–1 record, finished in fourth place in the Big Ten Conference with a 4–2–1 record against conference opponents, and outscored opponents by a total of 113 to 103.

Notable players on the 1955 Purdue team included quarterback Len Dawson, end Lamar Lundy, tackle Joe Krupa, and back Bill Murakowski.

Schedule

Roster

References

Purdue
Purdue Boilermakers football seasons
Purdue Boilermakers football